Home™ is the thirteenth studio album by American electronic musician Vektroid (under her alias PrismCorp Virtual Enterprises), released on April 20, 2013 by Beer on the Rug. Released simultaneously alongside ClearSkies™ under her PrismCorp alias, both albums contrast with her previous releases, which had a primary focus on samples. The two albums consist primarily of original MIDI-styled compositions, much akin to computer and video game music released during the 1990s and 2000s; Home™ additionally incorporates original MIDI covers of obscure music into its release, and it has been the first Vektroid release to use the PrismCorp Virtual Enterprises alias.

Track listing

Original release with Beer on the Rug

Cassette release

Side A

Side B

Home: Complete Edition

References

External links

Tiny Mix Tapes review

2013 albums
Vektroid albums
Vaporwave albums